Australia is a country in the Southern Hemisphere.

Australia may also refer to:

Places
 Name of Australia relates the history of the term, as applied to various places.

Oceania
Australia (continent),  or Sahul, the landmasses which sit on Australia's continental plate
Mainland Australia, the current continental landmass of Australia

Variant spelling 
La Austrialia (sic) del Espíritu Santo, an early Spanish name for the group of islands now known as Vanuatu

Elsewhere
Australia, Cuba, a village in Cuba
Australia, Mississippi, a ghost town in United States
Australia, Markham, a former community in Markham, Ontario, Canada

Film and television
 Australia (1989 film), directed by Jean-Jacques Andrien
 Australia (2008 film), directed by Baz Luhrmann
 "Australia" (Modern Family), an episode of the TV series Modern Family
 "Australia" (ChuckleVision), an episode of the ChuckleVision children's television show 
 Australia: The Story of Us, a 2015 television documentary drama series

Music

Albums
 Australia (Cusco album), 1993
 Australia (Mango album), 1985
 Australia (Howie Day album), 2000
 Australia (EP), by Ace Enders, 2009

Songs
 "Australia" (Gyroscope song), 2008
 "Australia" (The Kinks song), 1969
 "Australia" (Manic Street Preachers song), 1996
 "Australia" (The Shins song), 2007
 "Australia (Whore of the World)", by John Gordon, 2010
 "Australia", by Guttermouth from Chicken & Champagne, 2000
 "Australia", by the Bicycles from The Good, the Bad and the Cuddly, 2006
 "Australia", by the Jonas Brothers from Jonas Brothers, 2007
 "Australia", by Amanda Palmer from Amanda Palmer Goes Down Under, 2010

Ships
 Australia (schooner), a schooner used as a blockade runner in the American Civil War
 Australia (yacht), competed in the 1977 and 1980 America's Cups
 Australia II, a 12-metre yacht, Australia's first successful America's Cup challenger
 , three ships in the Royal Australian Navy
 , a ship in the Royal Navy

Other
 45563 Australia, a British LMS Jubilee Class locomotive
 Australia (LB&SCR no. 48), a London, Brighton and South Coast Railway B4 class 4-4-0 tender locomotive
 Australia, the Geographic Beanie Baby bear produced in honour of Australia
 Australia (board game), a board game by Ravensburger
 Australia (horse), a racehorse foaled in 2011
 Australia , a junior synonym of the wasp genus Parachalcerinys

See also

 Austral (disambiguation)
 Austrasia
 Australasia
 Australian (disambiguation)
 Austria
 The Australian (disambiguation)
 Oceania (disambiguation)
 Outline of Australia
 Terra Australis
 
 
 Austria (disambiguation)